FC Bereza-2010 (or Byaroza-2010) was a Belarusian football club based in Byaroza, Brest Oblast.

History

The team was founded in 1989 as Stroitel Bereza. They played in Belarusian SSR league from 1989 to 1991. In 1992, they joined newly created Belarusian Second League. After successful 1995 season they were promoted to the First League. Before the start of 1997 season they were renamed to FC Bereza.

In between 1998 and 1999 seasons Bereza merged with the local Second League club from the same town and adopted their name Keramik Bereza, while maintaining their own history. In 2002, they reverted the name back to FC Bereza. After unsuccessful 2006 season Bereza relegated back to Second League.

Current status
In 2010, the club, struggling with financial problems, came in agreement with Dinamo Minsk to become their feeder team and was renamed to Bereza-2010. Manned mostly with the players from Dinamo football academy, the club rejoined Second League. In 2011, they finished 2nd in the Second League and were promoted to the First League after 5 years of absence.

In early 2016 the club dissolved.

References

External links
 Official website

Association football clubs established in 1989
Association football clubs disestablished in 2016
Defunct football clubs in Belarus
1989 establishments in Belarus
2016 disestablishments in Belarus